"Midnight" is a song by Swedish DJ and record producer Alesso, featuring vocals from British singer Liam Payne. It was released as a single on 8 April 2020. The song appears as a streaming bonus track on Liam Payne's debut studio album LP1.

Background

Music video
A music video to accompany the release of "Midnight" was first released onto YouTube on 7 April 2020. The video was filmed in March 2020 and shows the two artists performing the song in separate studios, with Alesso in Los Angeles and Payne in London, Payne also performs the song on a rooftop garden.

Track listing

Personnel
Credits adapted from Tidal.

 Alessandro Lindblad – Producer, composer, lyricist, associated performer, programming
 Hoskins – Producer, additional producer
 Carl Lehmann – Composer, lyricist, acoustic guitar, associated performer, background vocalist
 Emanuel Abrahamsson – Composer, lyricist
 Neil Ormandy – Composer, lyricist
 Nirob Islam – Composer, lyricist
 Liam Payne – Associated performer, featured artist, vocals
 Ryan Shanahan – Mixer, studio personnel

Charts

Weekly charts

Year-end charts

Certifications

Release history

References

2020 songs
2020 singles
Alesso songs
Liam Payne songs
Songs written by Alesso
Songs written by Neil Ormandy
Song recordings produced by Alesso